Isurolamna is an extinct genus of mackerel shark from the Paleogene period. It contains at least three species and a fourth is sometimes placed in it. It is thought to be closely related to Macrorhizodus, Isurus, and Cosmopolitodus. Isurolamna arose in the Paleocene epoch during the Selandian age, and was extinct by the close of the Rupelian age of the Oligocene epoch. Some features which define this genus include a small, elliptical foramen (hole) in the middle of the lingual side of the root, triangular cusps except on lower interior teeth, and a relatively thick root with nearly vertical margins. The genus has a complicated taxonomic past.

Species
The following species are ascribed to the genus:

References

Lamnidae
Prehistoric shark genera